"Still Cruisin'" is a song written by Mike Love and Terry Melcher for the American rock band The Beach Boys. It was released on their 1989 album Still Cruisin' and reached number 11 in Austria, number 28 in Australia and number 93 on the Billboard Hot 100.

Recording
The song includes the vocals of Carl Wilson, Mike Love, Al Jardine, and Bruce Johnston.  The only then-active Beach Boys member not included in the recording was Brian Wilson. The main recording was done at Al Jardine's Red Barn Studios in Big Sur, Calif.  The guitars, bass & solo were played by Los Angeles studio musician, Craig Trippan Fall. The programming, including drums/keyboards were done by Keith Wechsler, who also was the engineer on the Still Cruisin' album, and the Summer in Paradise album.

Promotional video
VH-1 participated in the development of the promotional video for "Still Cruisin'" to help promote a Chevrolet Corvette giveaway for their then-young cable channel.  The video included four members of the Beach Boys singing the song at a concert with cutaways to several versions of the Corvette. Although Brian Wilson did not participate in the recording of "Still Crusin'", he did make a brief cameo appearance in the video: driving in his Corvette in silhouette during part of the intro, and during the lyrics "...paradise by the sea...", Brian is sitting on the oceanside and turns to the camera. These shots, alongside additional shots of Brian in his house playing the keyboard, were also intended to be part of a music video for "In My Car", also from the same album and also intended for Chevrolet promotion, which was ultimately scrapped for "Still Cruisin'".

Personnel 
The Beach Boys
 Mike Love – vocals
 Al Jardine – vocals
 Carl Wilson – vocals
 Bruce Johnston – vocals

Additional musicians
Craig Trippan Fall – guitars, bass guitar
Keith Wechsler – drums, keyboards

Live versions
During the Beach Boys 50th Anniversary Reunion Tour Al Jardine took over on Carl Wilson's original "When We Go Cruisin'.." line.

Chart positions

References

1989 songs
The Beach Boys songs
Songs written by Mike Love
Songs written by Terry Melcher
Song recordings produced by Terry Melcher
Capitol Records singles